Norway is a heavy producer of renewable energy because of hydropower. Over 99% of the electricity production in mainland Norway is from 31 GW hydropower plants (86 TWh reservoir capacity, storing water from summer to winter). The average hydropower is 133 TWh/year (135.3 TWh in 2007). There is also a large potential in wind power, offshore wind power and wave power, as well as production of bio-energy from wood. Norway has limited resources in solar energy, but is one of the world's largest producers of solar grade silicon and silicon solar cells.

Green certificates
The system for Guarantees of Origin was implemented by the EU Renewable Energy Directive 2009/28/EC, trading 'green certificates', the sale of which in 2010 relabeled the calculated average electricity consumption mix of a Norwegian household down from the actual 99% to 36% renewable.

Hydroelectric power

Norway is Europe's largest producer of hydropower and the 6th largest in the world. 90% of capacity is publicly owned. The largest producer is the Norwegian government, through the state-owned Statkraft which in turn, owns nine of the largest hydroelectric plants and is also a major player in the international energy markets. Electricity is also produced by a number of other state-owned and privately held companies. Hydropower generation capacity is around 31 GW in 2014 and 2019, when around 132 TWh was produced; about 95% of total production. Hydro production can vary 50-60 TWh between years, depending on amount of precipitation. Large reservoirs (86 TWh combined) are necessary due to precipitation being significantly lower in winter when consumption is highest, while meltwater rushes to the reservoirs in summer when consumption is at its lowest. When reservoirs are full, additional water must be passed through the spillway in a controlled manner to avoid damage. The largest reservoir is Blåsjø at 7.8 TWh. 

The remaining undeveloped hydro potential is about 34 TWh. By 2010 70% of the total potential had already been developed, one of the highest ratios in the world. Dam safety reassessment began in 1995 and by 2014, 26% of existing installations have been rehabilitated or upgraded. Generating capacity in Norway is growing, between 2001 and 2014 there were 397 new projects commissioned, larger than 1 MW. Upgrades to older installations larger than 10 MW represents 70% of all new capacity.  Electricity trading with wind power generated in the Netherlands, Germany and Denmark is driving modifications to the Norwegian hydro system.

Wind power

In 2012 Norway had a wind power electricity production of 1.6 TWh, a small fraction of its total production. The following year it approved spending  NOK to triple its wind power capacity of ca. 700 MW to more than 2 GW by 2020. In August 2016 construction of the 1 GW Fosen Vind project began. New projects increased capacity to 2.4 GW and production to 5.5 TWh in 2019. Increased production of power from wind turbines can allow Norway to curtail its domestic production of hydroelectricity (stopping hydro turbines), which due to being dispatchable is a valuable asset in the international power market. To further curtail its consumption of hydroelectricity, Norway imports electricity when excess wind production in Denmark, Germany and the Netherlands drives prices down there. To further develop its use of both cheap wind power and its dispatchable hydropower, Norway is considering new transmission lines to allow for the same trade with Scotland and Germany sometime after 2020. These are the North Sea Link and the NORD.LINK which are due to come online in 2021 and 2020 respectively. A public hearing in 2019 for further land-based turbine developments received over a thousand responses, the majority of which were negative.

Transport

In the transport sector the share of renewables has increased from 1.3% to 4% between 2005-2010, and currently Norway has one of the highest numbers of electric cars per capita in the world. The government's initial goal of 50,000 electric cars on Norwegian roads was reached on 20 April 2015, more than two years earlier than expected. By reaching a stock of 50,000 electric cars, the market penetration of pure electric vehicles achieved 2% of all passenger cars registered in Norway.  The segment's penetration passed 3% in December 2015. With about 90,000 pure electric vehicles registered by mid-September 2016, the all-electric segment achieved a market penetration of 3.5% of all light-duty vehicles on Norway's roads.

The stock of light-duty plug-in electric vehicles registered in Norway passed the 100,000 unit milestone in April 2016, making the country the fourth largest plug-in market in the world after the U.S., China and Japan. , the Norwegian fleet of plug-in electric vehicles consist of about 81,500 all-electric passenger and light-duty vehicles, almost 17,100 plug-in hybrids, and over 2,000 all-electric commercial vans. The total stock includes almost 12,000 used imported electric cars.

In February 2016, the government opened for public discussion until 1 July 2016 the proposed National Transport Plan 2018-2029 (NTP). The NTP set policies and actions to reduce greenhouse gas emissions from private cars, trucks, ships, aircraft and construction equipment by about one half until 2030.

In order to achieve this objective, among others, the NTP sets the goal that all new cars, buses and light commercial vehicles in 2025 should be zero emission vehicles, this is, all-electric and hydrogen vehicles. By 2030, heavy-duty vans, 75% of new long-distance buses, and 50% of new trucks must be zero emission vehicles. Also, by 2030, 40% of all ships in short sea shipping should be using biofuels or be low- or zero-emission ships such as electric ferries. The proposed strategy states that until zero-emission vehicles take over, all internal combustion engine cars sold be plug-in hybrids, and wherever possible, biofuels must be used. Also, government agencies should as far as possible make use of biofuels, low- and zero-emission technologies in private and hired vehicles and vessels. The plan also calls to support the deployment of zero emission vehicles, but also for the reduction of the existing incentives, and proposes to invest more in public transport, walking and cycling.

See also
Energy in Norway
Centre for Renewable Energy
Electricity sector in Norway
Scotland-Norway interconnector
Renewable energy in Sweden
Renewable energy in Finland
Renewable energy in Denmark
Renewable energy in Iceland
Renewable energy by country

References

External links

Renewable energy in Norway - Nordic Energy Solutions (?)
RenewableEnergy.no (?)
Norwegian Centre for Renewable Energy (?)
Norway proposes sea-based wind power